Eva Eun-Kyung Sandersen (Korean: Eva 은경 Sandersen, born 12 February 2001) is a Danish taekwondo athlete. She is the 2022 World Poomsae champion, 2020 World bronze medalist and 2019 European champion.

Career history 

Eva Sandersen started practicing the Korean martial arts taekwondo in 2009 at the suggestion of her parents.

Junior competitions 
Following a series of wins in earlier years, Sandersen participated in her first major competition as a junior at the 2016 World Taekwondo Poomsae Championships, where she won a silver medal in the junior's freestyle competition in the age group "under 17" (ages 15 to 17). Additionally, she competed in the junior's Recognized Poomsae competition, where she placed fifth. At this competition, Eva also competed alongside teammates Lærke Pedersen and Emma Kayerød-Rasmussenwon in the synchronous-team category, where the group received a fifth place as well.

Sandersen won a gold medal in the junior's Recognized Poomsae competition (ages 15 to 17) at the 2017 Taekwondo European Championships. At the same event, she also earned a second place in the junior's freestyle competition.

In 2018, Sandersen participated in the World Taekwondo Poomsae Championships, where she earned two bronze medals - on in the Recognized Poomsae competition and on in the Freestyle Poomsae competition for the age group from 15 to 17 years. That same year, she won the gold medal in the Recognized Poomsae competition at the 2018 World Taekwondo Beach Championships.

Senior competitions 
Sandersen participated in her first senior competition in 2019, at the 14th Taekwondo European Poomsae Championships in Antalya. She became European champion in the women's senior Recognized Poomsae competition (ages 18 to 30).

In February 2020, Sandersen ruptured an Achilles tendon during a training session and had to take a break from competing for six months.

At the end of the same year, she won her first major medal on the international stage at the 2020 Online World Taekwondo Poomsae Championships, where she claimed bronze. The competition was held online due to the COVID-19 pandemic.

In 2021, Sandersen won the gold medal in the freestyle category of the women's senior competition (over 17 years of age) at the 15th Taekwondo European Poomsae Championships in Portugal.

At the Goyang 2022 World Taekwondo Poomsae Championships, she became the world champion in the women's Recognized Poomsae senior competition (ages 18 to 30). Additionally, Sandersen won the bronze medal in the women's Freestyle Poomsae competition.

Public appearances 

Sandersen participated in the fifth and final season of Danmark Har Talent in November 2019. She performed several programs consisting of taekwondo moves combined with stunt elements. Sandersen advanced into the finals but missed out on the Top 5, finishing in the 6th to 10th ranking.

Personal life 

Sandersen began studying for a degree in Pharmaceutical Sciences in 2021.

References 

Living people
2001 births
Taekwondo